Luverne Municipal Airport , also known as Quentin Aanenson Field, is a public use airport in Rock County, Minnesota, United States. It is owned by the City of Luverne and located two nautical miles (4 km) south of its central business district. This airport is included in the National Plan of Integrated Airport Systems for 2011–2015, which categorized it as a general aviation facility.

Although many U.S. airports use the same three-letter location identifier for the FAA and IATA, this airport is assigned LYV by the FAA but has no designation from the IATA.

Facilities and aircraft 
Quentin Aanenson Field covers an area of 85 acres (34 ha) at an elevation of 1,435 feet (437 m) above mean sea level. It has one runway designated 18/36 with an asphalt surface measuring 4,200 by 75 feet (1,280 x 23 m).

For the 12-month period ending July 21, 2010, the airport had 8,400 general aviation aircraft operations, an average of 23 per day. At that time there were 16 single-engine aircraft based at this airport.

References

External links 
 Airport page at City of Luverne website
 Sierra Delta Aviation, the fixed-base operator (FBO) 
 Skydive Adventures, the Skydiving Club
 Aerial image as of April 1991 from USGS The National Map
 

Airports in Minnesota
Buildings and structures in Rock County, Minnesota
Transportation in Rock County, Minnesota